Citation is a 2020 Nigerian film directed by Kunle Afolayan, written by Tunde Babalola and starring Jimmy Jean-Louis, Temi Otedola, Bukunmi Oluwashina, Gabriel Afolayan and a host of others.

Synopsis
The film is about a university student who speaks out after a university professor attempts to rape her, and the reaction of the university institution to the claims. The film is broadly based on true events.

Cast
 Jimmy Jean-Louis as Prof. Lucien N'Dyare
 Temi Otedola as Moremi
 Bukunmi Oluwashina as Uzoamaka
 Adjetey Anang as Kwesi
 Joke Silva as Angela
 Ini Edo as Gloria
Ibukun Awosika as herself
 Ropo Ewenla as Dr. Grillo
 Gbubemi Ejeye as Rachel
 Yomi Fash-Lanso as Lucien Legal Rep.
 Gabriel Afolayan as Koyejo
 Oyewole Olowomojuore as Prof. Osagye
 Sadiq Daba as Prof. Yahaya
 Samantha Okanlawon as Social Activist 1
 Casilda Okanlawon as Social Activist 2
 Neba as Dr. Sembene
 Toyin Bifarin Ogundeji as Dr. Mrs. Nwosu

Reception

According to the cast and crew, Citation rose to the sixth-most popular film on Netflix shortly after its release, and was most-watched on Netflix in Nigeria.

Digital Spy's Nelson C.J. wrote that the subject matter of Citation was important to discuss, and treated with an "objective and sufficiently informed" perspective within the film. C.J. praised the cinematography, but found that the dialogue could have been improved and the main character given more depth. Tambay Obenson of IndieWire praised the film as an "unflinching wakeup call that extends well beyond Nigeria's borders". The movie won the best international film awards at the national film awards.

Awards and nominations

References

External links
 
 

2020 films
English-language Netflix original films
Nigerian thriller drama films